Kathryn L. Sessions (born February 13, 1942) was a Democratic member of the Wyoming Senate, who represented the 7th district from 1999 until 2011. She previously served in the Wyoming House of Representatives from 1993 through 1998.

Sessions is a Latter-day Saint.

External links
Wyoming State Legislature - Senator Kathryn Sessions official WY Senate website
Project Vote Smart - Senator Kathryn L. Sessions (WY) profile
Follow the Money - Kathryn Sessions
2006 2004 20021998 1996 1994 1992 campaign contributions

Democratic Party Wyoming state senators
Democratic Party members of the Wyoming House of Representatives
1942 births
Living people
Women state legislators in Wyoming
American Latter Day Saints
21st-century American women